Worden is a village in Madison County, Illinois, United States. The population was 1,096 at the 2020 census.

History
Worden was originally called "New Hampton", and under the latter name was laid out in 1860. When the railroad was built through the settlement in 1870, the name "Worden" was given to the station, after John C. Worden, an English immigrant, businessman, and railroad promoter.

Geography
Worden is located in northern Madison County at  (38.932241, -89.840216).

The village drains west to tributaries of Cahokia Creek, a west-flowing direct tributary of the Mississippi River.

Demographics

At the 2000 census there were 905 people, 378 households, and 261 families living in the village. The racial makeup of the village was 99.34% White, 0.44% Native American, 0.11% from other races, and 0.11% from two or more races. Hispanic or Latino of any race were 1.22%.

Of the 378 households 32.5% had children under the age of 18 living with them, 55.6% were married couples living together, 11.6% had a female householder with no husband present, and 30.7% were non-families. 27.0% of households were one person and 13.5% were one person aged 65 or older. The average household size was 2.39 and the average family size was 2.90.

The age distribution was 24.3% under the age of 18, 7.7% from 18 to 24, 30.6% from 25 to 44, 23.4% from 45 to 64, and 13.9% 65 or older. The median age was 36 years. For every 100 females, there were 90.1 males. For every 100 females age 18 and over, there were 88.2 males.

The median household income was $36,100 and the median family income  was $40,909. Males had a median income of $35,294 versus $20,156 for females. The per capita income for the village was $18,485. About 13.1% of families and 12.0% of the population were below the poverty line, including 19.4% of those under age 18 and 3.9% of those age 65 or over.

Notable people
Evelyn M. Bowles, Illinois state senator; born in Worden
Karen May, another Illinois state senator was born in Worden.

References
v

Villages in Madison County, Illinois
Villages in Illinois